Barsoi is a town and nagar panchayat which serves headquarters of a subdivision in Katihar district in the state of Bihar, India.
It is an important railway junction under Katihar division Northeast Frontier Railway zone of Indian Railways.

Barsoi Junction connects four routes as in the north Siliguri Junction on broad gauge and New Jalpaiguri Junction on broad gauge, on broad gauges Radhikapur near Bangladesh border on east and Katihar Junction on west and on south Kumedpur Junction railway station, Kolkata.It is one of the biggest railway junction of NFR.

Divisions 
Barsoi subdivision is divided into four community development blocks: Kadwa, Azamnagar, Barsoi and Balrampur.

See also
	
 Barsoi (Vidhan Sabha constituency)

References 

Cities and towns in Katihar district